The  (or People's Guard), is the autonomous police force for the Basque Country, largely replacing the Spanish Policía Nacional (National Police) and Guardia Civil (Civil Guard). An Ertzaintza member is called an ertzaina.

History

Origins 
The origins of the current Ertzaintza can be traced back to the old municipal militias, which were popular organizations at the service of local bodies, created to satisfy the need for public safety. But it was not until the 19th century when the almost permanent police corps of a professional nature were created.

It was a response to the banditry caused by the continuous social and political upheaval occurring from the end of the 18th century and well into the 19th. The decisive argument for its configuration was the First Carlist War, when the Miqueletes of Biscay and Guipuzcoa and the Miñones of Alava commenced their activities.

Once the urgencies of the war were overcome, the Spanish government attempted to recover the functions carried out by these regional forces and transfer them to the Civil Guard, which was created in 1844. Nevertheless, due to difficulties encountered when recruiting forces for this corps in the Basque provinces, plus the pressure posed by the other regional Governments, the very same regional forces were able to more or less carry on with their task.

After Carlist Wars 
After the end of the Second Carlist War (1876), the Spanish government wished to curtail the regional autonomy. The Basque police forces had to adapt to this new centralist tendency, and these changes mostly manifested themselves in a reduction of personnel & operational capabilities.
 
When the Second Spanish Republic was proclaimed in 1931, political activity surged and so did the Basque claim to re-establish regional liberties that had been abolished in 1876. Thus, various projects for the Autonomy Statute were promoted.

On October 1, 1936, during the Spanish Civil War, the Basque Statute of Autonomy come into force, leading to the establishment of an autonomous government with actual authority over the provinces of Biscay and Guipuzcoa.
One of the priorities of the new government was the re-establishment of public order.

The Basque Interior Minister Telesforo Monzón set up several institutions, such as the International Police Force, the Maritime Police and the Public Order Body. Their main task was the creation of a police force named Ertzaña (a Basque neologism for "People care"), with 500 infantry and 400 motorised (Ertzañ Igiletua) men, totalling joint forces of around 1,200 agents.
Most of the British Riley Motor cars acquired for the motorised police did not arrive due to the Non-Intervention Pact. 
The majority of the Ertzaña were Basque speakers from the Basque Nationalist Party
Its headquarters were in Bilbao, at the Ibaigane Palace (currently the headquarters of Athletic Bilbao).

When the war on the Basque front concluded, the Ertzaña was dissolved, and Franco's Nationalist regime pretended that this institution had never existed in the first place.

Having allied themselves with the losing Republican side, Biscay and Guipuzcoa were considered "traitor provinces" and most of their autonomy was annulled.
However, since at the outbreak of the civil war Alava and Navarre had thrown their lot in with the Nationalists, the Miñones and Miqueletes continued on duty, with assignments such as traffic patrols and custody of the regional institutions.

During transition 

After the Spanish transition to democracy, the autonomous Basque Government was restored. Its government once again took up the spirit of the Ertzaña of 1936 to design, in 1980, the new autonomous police force of the Basque Country, the Ertzaintza (a more grammatical form). Previously, a Royal Decree re-established the "Forales" and the "Miqueletes" in Biscay and Guipuzcoa and gave a new configuration to the "Miñones" corps in Alava. These institutions were incorporated into the new Basque Police Force.

Navarre, during the events surrounding Spain's 1978 Constitution, ended up with the status of Autonomous Community and was not lumped in with the Basque autonomous community, and its police force (Policía Foral) remains independent of the Ertzaintza.

Officers

The first officers were members of the Basque Nationalist Party. Although the law required that Ertzaintza commissioned officers had to be previous members of the Spanish army or the State police forces, this was often ignored.

This new police force, made up of Basque citizens, developed in an organized manner from 1982, and was progressively deployed starting from the countryside towards the cities.

Like many other Spanish Military and Police agencies Ertzaintza issues the H&K USP Compact chambered in 9mm.

Rank insignia

Problems with ETA and controversies 
Ertzaintza is not accepted by the Basque nationalist parties ETA and Batasuna, who deride it as zipaioak, or sepoys, an indigenous force serving the colonial power. As Ertzaintza took a more relevant role in the fight against ETA, it has become a target for them. It was soon infiltrated by ETA members, like Iñaki de Juana Chaos. In the areas where support for ETA is higher, ertzainas are forced to reside elsewhere and commute to work.
Fourteen ertzainas have been killed or injured by ETA, sometimes being specifically targeted.

The Spanish government has had reservations about Ertzaintza. Spanish parties have often accused the Basque Home Office (in most terms held by the Basque Nationalist Party) of being soft on the fight against ETA and its supporting party Batasuna. Two police officers of Ertzaintza said that the former nationalist government "gave them orders not to act against ETA members and its social environment". Because of infiltration, Ertzaintza is not allowed by the Spanish Ministry of the Interior to access the Interpol intelligence network.
On 1 March 2010, Ertzaintza joined the Center for Police and Customs Cooperation in Hendaye, France, near the Spanish border.
It is a joint police station for information exchange with the French police.
The Spanish Civil Guard, the Spanish National Police Corps and the Customs Watch Services of the Spanish Tax Agency are also part of the center.

Lack of communication has occasionally led to shootings among police forces.

Some councillors of the Basque Country said that they have perceived a "decrease of the pro-ETA menace because of the current important role of the Ertzaintza against terrorism".

Etymology 

However to maintain a link to the past, the silent H was not included.
The Basque pop group  ("The policemen") chose their name prior to the re-establishment of the corps and applied the modern spelling rules.

References

External links 

 Official web page 
 Policía / Ertzaintza in the Spanish-language Auñamendi Encyclopedia.

Basque Government
Regional law enforcement agencies of Spain
1980 establishments in the Basque Country (autonomous community)